Dmitri Kraush (born 18 June 1969) is a retired Russian professional footballer.

Kraush played in the Russian Top League with Asmaral Moscow.

External links
Profile at Footballfacts.ru

1969 births
Living people
Soviet footballers
Russian footballers
Russian Premier League players
Russian expatriate footballers
FC Baník Prievidza players
MŠK Púchov players
Expatriate footballers in Slovakia
Russian expatriate sportspeople in Slovakia
FC Shinnik Yaroslavl players
FC Asmaral Moscow players
Association football midfielders
FC Torpedo Moscow players
FC FShM Torpedo Moscow players